The arsenic minerals or arsenic group are a group of trigonal symmetry minerals composed of arsenic-like elements, and one alloy.

The elements are arsenic, antimony and bismuth.  The alloy is stibarsen (SbA) an alloy of arsenic and antimony.

References

 
Mineral groups